The , also known as  or "Kagerou Days", is a Japanese mixed-media project. The story revolves around the Mekakushi Dan, a group of young people with unusual eye-related powers.

The franchise became infamous on the video sharing website Niconico after the release of the music video and song "Kagerou Daze", which also gave the series its name. The song has amassed over 10 million views and is the most popular song of the project. A 12-episode anime adaptation titled —"Mekakucity" being a portmanteau of "mekakushi" ("blindfold" in Japanese) and "city"—aired between April 12 and June 28, 2014. The series was directed by Akiyuki Shinbo and Yuki Yase, and animated at Shaft, with the script also written by Jin.

Plot

Main Storyline
Shintarō Kisaragi is an 18-year-old who has not left his room for two years due to his internet addiction. But when Shintarō spills a drink on his computer keyboard, he has to buy a replacement in person. At the department store, he witnesses a group of criminals break in and hold the customers hostage. He witnesses the  stop the criminals using mysterious powers. The group then forces Shintarō to join the group. 

Shintarō's younger sister is called Momo Kisaragi, she is a popular idol and a first-year high school student. Her uncontrollable ability is 'Drawing Eye' which allows her to attract people's attention. She meets the leader of Mekakushi Dan, Tsubomi Kido, who invites Momo to join the group before Shintarō's encounter with the group. Momo agrees.

Momo and the Mekakushi Dan go the department store to purchase a new phone. Kido uses her powers to prevent people from staring at Momo. At the department store, they see Shintarō. They stop the criminals and save the hostages. Meanwhile, Shintarō has passed out. When he awakens, he is introduced to the group.

The prologue for the novels' storyline is told in the second novel. Takane Enomoto and Haruka Kokonose, students of Kenjirō Tateyama, are planning a class booth for their school's cultural festival. Haruka gets an idea to host a shooting booth; however, this idea could not be fulfilled due to Kenjirō having already spent all their booth funds. Takane, being a highly skilled gamer, decides that instead of an expensive shooting booth, they should make a video game of a first-person shooter type. Kenjirō would be in charge of programming, Haruka was in charge of illustration and Takane was responsible for playing as the opponent. Their plan captured a great amount of attention, good or bad.

Alternate Storylines
The series contains alternative storylines, endings (and in some cases, beginnings) depending on the format of the media, called "routes".

 Music Route, occurring between the years 2011-2013 initially and otherwise beyond, is the original first "route". It comes first in the official "timelines" order. It contains all of the official music videos for the "Kagerou Project" songs, with music by Jin, and animations by Wannyanpū and Sidu. Many notable songs, however, are left out of the initial, chronological "music route" described, though they are stated to still be included in the overall route. "Lost Time Memory" in Music Route splits into "Route XX", "Route 1", and "Route 2", with "XX" being a "bad ending", "1" leading to the main storyline, and "2" implied a "good ending".
 Manga Route, published between the years 2012 (June) and march 2019, comes second in the official "timelines" order. Though it was debuted in June 2012, Jin confirmed he was working on the manga earlier on, writing the story for it as of "Konoha's World Situation"'s music video release in May 2012. The manga would later split into two alternate timelines, the second following drastically different events from the first.
 Novels Route, published between the years 2012 (May) through 2017 (2018 for the US release), comes after Manga Route and seemingly before the Mekakucity Actors anime in the official "timelines" order.
 Mekakucity Actors Route, the initially airing anime which aired beginning of April 2014 through June 2014, was not included in the official timelines of the "Kagerou Project Perfect Guide" (2016); however, the anime itself signifies more initially conclusive events. The lack of inclusion in the official timelines, despite its existence at the time, seems to indicate it comes after them as well.
 Kagerou Daze -in a day's- (カゲロウデイズ-in a day's-) is an MX4D produced an animated short movie in which the Mekakushi Dan join together to once again stop an incident occurring at the mall. This Mekakushi Dan consists of Dan members 1-7 initially, and also containing Ene, Hibiya Amamiya, Konoha, and Hiyori Asahina. This is despite many notable events of the previous "routes". Certain other members related to the Dan do not appear in this "route", while instead "new" characters do; however, the "new" characters' identities were kept somewhat secret, including their names. An initial promotion for the film described it as a "Route-2", though the events contained seem wholly different to the "Route-2" that occurs in "Lost Time Memory"'s music video. The "new" characters were created specifically for this film.

Various other (including smaller or shorter) "timelines" are also contained within major "routes" or other side materials. These are all indicated in detail in the "Kagerou Project Perfect Guide" (2016). While many "timelines" occur between the dates of August 14–15 (and in some cases a short time beyond, such as August 17, among other dates) some "timelines"'s initial storylines are indicated to happen before the "main" series begins. This often involves the backstories of the "trio" of Kido, Kano, and Seto and their encounters, on their own or otherwise, and notably involving supporting characters Ayano Tateyama, and Mekakushi Dan member Marry Kozakura (notably detailing her meeting with character Seto). Yet more timelines occur detailing Marry's own backstory, and events that happen long before that; also indicated by which timeline, or "August 15th" (among similar close dates) is referred to.

Characters

Mekakushi Dan
 / 

Kido is member No. 1 of the Mekakushi Dan and its current leader. She is often mistaken as a male due to her ambiguous appearance. The other members of the Dan call her "Danchō" (lit. gang leader). Like Kano and Seto, she is addressed by her legal last name even by her closest friends.

She was born as the first daughter of a wealthy family, but due to being the illegitimate child between her biological father and his mistress. Because she was always treated cautiously by those around her, she harbored a strong desire to "disappear". One day, her father's business went bankrupt, driving him to set their house on fire. After being burned to death, Kido came into contact with the Heat Haze along with her older half-sister Rin and was possessed by the snake with the "Concealing Eyes" ability, thus acquiring the power to hide her presence, as well as the presence of anyone else within a two meter radius. She would then proceed to forget this event (of the Heat Haze) completely, until later on in the seventh novel, "From the Darkness". Becoming childhood friends with Seto and Kano in the same orphanage, she was later fostered temporarily by the Tateyama family, until events forced them out of the Tateyamas' home, including a "route" where they cut off all ties with Ayano. Initially encouraged by Ayano that having red eyes was the sign of a hero, she and the "trio" (her, Seto, and Kano) started the Mekakushi Dan. After Ayano's death, she was then given the role of "leader".

 / 
, Sayori Ishizuka (young)
Seto is member No. 2 of the Mekakushi Dan. He is often portrayed as the "nice" one of the group, and gets along very well with Marry. Like Kano and Kido, he is addressed by his legal last name even by his closest friends.

As a young boy, he was often bullied. He considered an abandoned dog (named "Hanako") to be his only friend, and wished that he could "understand how people felt without using words". One stormy day, he witnessed some kids trying to throw his dog into a river. Despite his efforts, the dog was thrown in, and Seto threw himself into the river in order to save it. As he drowned, he came into contact with the Heat Haze and was possessed by the snake with the "Stealing Eyes" ability, acquiring the ability to read others' minds upon eye contact. However, he dislikes using his eye ability as he feels that it is invasive, he avoids using it unless it is necessary. He eventually was fostered temporarily by the Tateyama family along with Kido and Kano. Together they created the Mekakushi Dan after being initially encouraged by Ayano.

"Imagination Forest" (as "")'s original music video was where he debuted, he comes into contact with Marry with his "younger" looking design.. His expression is partly hidden the entire time, as his older design hadn't yet been made by animator Sidu (this would not occur until later on, with the official website's reveal). In , Seto appears with his eyes and expressions visible alongside his older design appearing towards the end as well.

 / 
, Yuki Kaida (young)
Kano is member No. 3 of the Mekakushi Dan. He is depicted as a deceitful person, to the point where no one can tell if he's lying or telling the truth.

When Kano was younger, he did not attend preschool or kindergarten and instead lived alone with his mother in an apartment. His emotionally unstable mother was abusive, and the neighbors spread rumors that he was being abused by her. In the novels "route", he believed that he was wrong for upsetting her, and desired strongly to "hide the bruises/wounds on his body" from those around him because they were the reason the neighbors disliked his mother. One day (in the novels "route"), his apartment was broken into by thieves. Kano's mother was stabbed and killed as she tried to protect him. He was stabbed to death as well when he tried to fight against the thieves, coming into contact with the Heat Haze. He was then possessed by the snake with the "Deceiving Eyes" ability, acquiring the power to alter how people around him perceive him and anything in immediate contact with him.

He was eventually brought to an orphanage and was later fostered temporarily by the Tateyama family, where he met Kido, Seto. While being fostered temporarily by the Tateyama family, they meet a younger Ayano (Kano having already met her previously as a stranger in the novels "route"). They created a team of "heroes" and Kano gave it its name, the Mekakushi Dan—"Mekakushi" being a pun on Kido's eye ability. Unlike Seto, Kano uses his eye ability frequently, to hide his true feelings on the inside. He and Ayano were very close, as she only shared her suspicions about Kenjirō with him. As a result (in the novels "route") he often impersonated her and went to school in her stead, while she researched a way to stop the plans of Clearing Eyes. Ayano's death affects him greatly, and the added trauma of (in the novels "route") having to pretend to be Ayano's corpse during the funeral (as she did not leave behind a body) leaves him emotionally distressed.

He briefly is seen wearing hair clips while grinning, while images of a younger Seto and younger Kido are also seen behind him (Seto also wears items connected to Ayano in the music video). Kano is later seen with a "female" form, shown more than once (including together) in both the official music video as well as published artbooks. He is always "Deceiving", initially believing himself to be something like a "monster". When a "monster" (implied to be Clearing Eyes in the novels) speaks to him one day, Kano begins to descend into always telling "lies", unable to tell his true self from his "Deceiving" self.

 / 

Marry is member No. 4 of the Mekakushi Dan, and the first non-founding member. She is 1/4 Medusa and has white hair that wiggles when she is happy or frightened and naturally occurring red eyes. Her appearance is that of a teenage girl, her actual age is 140 years. Marry is extremely shy around strangers, and will often hide behind Seto, Kido, or Momo.

When Marry was younger, she lived in a small house in the woods with her mother, Shion, who was half Medusa. While growing up, she was constantly warned by her mother that should they make eye contact with others, the person would be turned to stone. One day, when she was playing outside against her mother's warnings, she was found and tortured by a group of boys. Shion successfully turned Marry's attackers to stone, but the two were both beaten to death and were brought into the Heat Haze by Azami. Shion's full Medusa mother (and Marry's grandmother). Upon entering it, Azami planted the snake with the "Combining Eyes" ability, the core of the Medusa, into Shion, who willingly gave it up to Marry so that she could have a second chance at life. As a result, along with the "Eye Contact" ability she had since birth (which allows Marry to temporarily paralyze anyone she makeseye contact with), Marry later acquired the ability to unify all of the "snakes".

After coming back to life, she lived in isolation for over a hundred years, greatly traumatized by her mother's death and terrified by the outside world. By chance, Seto visited the forest and befriended her, making her realize that the outside isn't so scary after all. He later managed to bring her to the outside world and invited her to join the Mekakushi Dan.

In Route XX among other "bad end" timelines, Clearing Eyes kills all the members of the Mekakushi Dan besides Marry, and has her reset the timeline. This happens by means of her Combining Eyes ability, used through her by the snake of 'Clearing Eyes', who "awakens" her.(often in "Queen" form), and, by "collecting" the snakes that "have lost their owners", she reverses time in order to save everyone. Marry seemingly reverses time at the end of every official "route" and "timeline" seen thus far.

It's also revealed in the same alternate second timeline of the manga that Marry's "Queen" (of the snakes) power here causes a great toll on her body as it slowly deteriorates her body to the point she can't move at all, possibly a result of her being more human than Medusa. Despite her cheerful personality, a monologue in the manga implies that while she loves her friends, she harbors a grudge against the world for taking everything from her, reflecting some of the attitudes her grandmother Azami and her mother Shion held towards humanity. She begins to absorb the powers of the snakes of her fallen comrades. The Mekakushi Dan members left, including her, would then attempt to face off against the Snake of Clearing Eyes.

 / 

Momo is member No. 5 of the Mekakushi Dan. She is a first-year high school student. She is the younger sister of Shintarō and a popular idol, which greatly disrupts her normal life and causes a lot of stress for her. Unlike her brother, she does badly at school and is a clumsy yet cheerful girl. Momo's tastes are also shown to be rather strange.

When Momo was younger, she was constantly overshadowed by her brother Shintarō causing her to yearn for attention. During a trip to the beach, she drowned in the ocean and was swallowed up by the Heat Haze, along with her father who had tried to save her and given the snake of "Drawing Eyes", which is capable of catching people's attention regardless of their preferences. At a fairly young age as a Junior High schooler, she gets a job as an idol, but she finds the constant attention and pressure miserable, lamenting that she just wants to be normal. It's here that she meets Kido, who explains the nature of their powers and offers to teach Momo how to control her Drawing Eyes if she joins the Mekakushi Dan. Momo accepts, to Shintarō's eventual chagrin.

 / 

Ene is member No. 6 of Mekakushi Dan. She is a mischievous cyber girl who lives in Shintarō's computer, but is also able to travel to other electronic devices. Once a human named , her personality as Ene is a cheerful prankster, a sharp contrast to Takane's pessimistic outlook at life.

As a human, she suffered from an illness that causes her to lose consciousness at random times. Because of this, she was placed in a separate class at school with Haruka Kokonose, whom she harbored feelings for. As a human, Takane was ranked second in the country on a game called 'Dead Bullet -1989-' under the name of "Senkou no Maihime" (lit. Dancing Princess of the Spotlight)' and often stayed up late at night playing. This exacerbated her narcolepsy and made her irritable and bad-tempered at school. She died after being poisoned by Kenjirō. Upon entering the Heat Haze, she is given the snake of "Opening Eyes," giving her immortality through the ability to reside in digital objects. After becoming Ene, she was sent to Shintarō's computer in an email from an unknown sender. Shintarō refers to her as a 'virus' as she constantly plays pranks on him by deleting his files and threatening to upload his embarrassing poems on to the internet. Ene joins the Mekakushi Dan after helping to stop a terrorist attack at a local department store with Shintarō.

 / 
 
Shintarō is member No. 7 of Mekakushi Dan. He is the main protagonist of the story and has an IQ of 168. While he was in school, his intelligence caused him to have an apathetic personality.

After a while, he became interested in the girl who sat next to him in class, Ayano Tateyama. Despite Ayano always acting cheerful and friendly towards him, Shintarō would treat Ayano with something like coldness - though he is also shown to begin to regard Ayano at all, if not fully as a "friend". Ayano appears happy whenever Shintaro regards her. After Ayano's suicide, he falls into a deep depression and becomes a hikikomori addicted to the internet. A year after, he was "sent" a mysterious "virus" named Ene, and as he was unable to control her actions, his lifestyle was at a loss. After stopping a terrorist attack with Ene, he became involved with Mekakushi Dan. He would later come to possess the "Retaining Eyes", which allow him to remember all of the past (including all other previous routes and otherwise diverging timelines).

In the songs ("Music Route") Ayano's death results in two possible routes for the Mekakushi Dan, as shown in Lost Time Memory. In Route 1, also known as the Good End Route, Shintarō (often portrayed in a red jersey) goes out and meets the Mekakushi Dan instead of staying at home and mourning Ayano. In Route XX, also known as the Bad End, Shintarō (often portrayed in full black clothing), still mourning over Ayano's death at 18 years old, becomes fed up with Ene and kills her through unknown means, causing him to have a mental breakdown. The main Shintarō dies while saving "Kuroha" (or, Clearing Eyes possessed Konoha) from shooting himself, while Route XX Shintarō commits suicide by slitting his throat with a pair of red scissors. However, all of these events would supposedly lead to Shintarō coming to possess "Retaining Eyes".

Later on in the manga's alternate second timeline, he would officially join the Mekakushi Dan again. He does so by going to their new hideout, and encounters Ayano. Though Ayano initially tries to point out he doesn't have an eye power to protect himself while seeming nervous by his presence; Shintarō goes on to explain: he thought, if there was "someone he could save", he'll "keep struggling" to "protect that person", "and that person can be no one else" but Ayano herself. He declares he'll use all of his "life force" to "fight" for her, also declaring, "I'm here to help you!". Ayano responds by blushing terribly in her shock and surprise, and he is accepted into the Dan's hideout.

 / 

Hibiya is member No. 8 of Mekakushi Dan. He is mentioned to be mature for his age and is shown to have an immense crush on Hiyori. In the novels and anime, he joins Mekakushi Dan after being spotted escaping the hospital he was at after an accident.

As a sixth-grade primary schooler, he is the youngest member of the group, at 12 years old (in "Mekakucity Talkers", he prepares to take Junior High exams, and later meets back up with Hiyori "at school" in what's initially implied to be a post-summer scenario.). He has the "Eye Focusing" ability, meaning he can see distant objects from an aerial view. He is originally from a village in the rural countryside and came with Hiyori Asahina to the city for the summer. He stayed at Hiyori's sister's house for the visit and met Konoha, who was living there at the time.

Hibiya sees Hiyori die in a traffic accident and somehow becomes stuck in a time loop trying to save her from dying, each time ending with him sacrificing himself to try and save Hiyori. He comes in contact with the Heat Haze and is given the snake of 'Focusing Eyes'.

 / 

Konoha is member No. 9 of Mekakushi Dan. Shown to be a rather absent-minded individual, he has a large appetite, similar to his human self as Haruka.

As a human, Haruka suffered from an illness which caused him to have "attacks" and collapse, making him have less time to live, hence making him wish for a body that would not be as vulnerable, and hence being placed in a separate class with Takane Enomoto. With the interference of Kenjirō, he suffers an attack and dies, entering the Heat Haze with Takane, and therefore receiving the "Awakening Eyes" ability, which allows him to live in his ideal body. However, instead of being sent back like the others in the Heat Haze, Haruka stayed in the Heat Haze while the Snake of Awakening Eyes inhabits his body as Konoha, attempting to carry on Haruka's wishes of spending time with his friends. After this, the amnesiac Konoha stays at Ayaka's house, where he meets Hibiya and Hiyori and attempts to save them from the Heat Haze.

Though Konoha is born from such means, he is seen as being overall different from Haruka - Takane even noting such in the anime (and Ene thus calling Konoha "imposter") and is treated as being his own person. He is noted to have an "immortal body".

An alternate version of Konoha appears in Outer Science, notably during the "Music Route", called Black Konoha (also dubbed as Kuroha by Japanese fans,  meaning 'black'), and kills everyone in Route XX. In Route 1 (notably during "Lost Time Memory", in "Music Route") for unknown reasons, he attempts to shoot himself in the head, only to be saved by Shintarō; "Kuroha"'s eyes widening in shock as he watches Shintarō fall (it is unknown if the one shocked in "Music Route" was Konoha, or Clearing Eyes himself). In the anime, "Kuroha" is revealed to be the snake of 'Clearing Eyes', Kenjirō's eye ability, which has transferred itself to Konoha (termed "forming" in him) and possessed him, believing him to be a stronger vessel.

 / 

Ayano is member No. 0 of the Mekakushi Dan and was the daughter of Kenjirō and Ayaka Tateyama. Shown to be a happy-go-lucky girl with rather poor grades, she was the deskmate of Shintarō, and it is suggested that her poor grades stemmed from her family matters.

In most major timelines after her parents briefly fostered three young children with red eyes, Kido, Seto, and Kano, she decided to fulfill her role as "big sister" ("onee-chan") by creating the Mekakushi Dan to encourage them. After the death of her mother in a landslide and the discovery that her father was experimenting on her friends in an attempt to bring her back to life, Ayano grew increasingly concerned of the safety of the "trio". She committed suicide by jumping off the roof of her school in an attempt to save her family and friends from the plot of the snake that gives Kenjirō the 'Clearing Eyes.' She gets possessed by a snake and obtains the 'Favoring Eyes,' which allows her to project her thoughts and emotions unto others.

An Ayano that Shintarō meets at some times (in the real world) is revealed to also be Kano (including in the novels) using his "Deceiving" ability, who does so to spite Shintarō, whom he believes caused Ayano's death. However, Kano would later apologize for the incidents in the seventh novel ("From the Darkness") and Shintarō forgives him, genuinely befriending Kano. Kano would go on to believe (thinking to himself) he was no match for Shintarō. Kano also notes to himself Shintarō would "show a different kind of smile" to "Ayano only"; then thinking Shintarō showed "that kind of smile" to Kano himself as well, showing they fully reconcile.

An Ayano that Shintarō meets in the Heat Haze at other times is revealed to be his own snake, taking on her form wearing her black school uniform, but without her red scarf.

In Route 1, after Shintarō (in red jersey) meets the real Ayano in the Heat Haze, she passes her eye ability to him.

In the music video for the "Music Route" song "Additional Memory", it is revealed she apparently loved Shintarō since the very start all along, saying she didn't want to be "just" "friends". This revelation and seeming realization to herself occurs as she continuously falls from the buildings' rooftop, eventually waking up in the Daze, appearing to her as a warped classroom in monochrome colors and covered in flowers. Ayano sees the classroom from the sky as well, and seems to come to another realization; later encountering who appears to be Marry (in "Queen" form), while a physical snake (in snake form) appears above a then-leaning Ayano (as she leans in front of the also-kneeling Marry). Ayano would then go on to say (as she falls continuously, and seemingly not in person); "I'm sorry", "Sayonara", (lit. "goodbye" or "farewell"), and "Daisuki da yo" (lit: "I love you"), to who is indicated to be "Shintarō" (seen as he looked previously in the beginning of the "Lost Time Memory" music video, where he walked with Ayano down the street to their school).

Other characters
 / 

Kenjirō is the father of Ayano and husband of Ayaka. He was also Haruka and Takane's homeroom teacher and is Momo's tutor.

He possesses the ability of 'Clearing Eyes' and seems to know about Medusae. When he was in university, he fell in love with Ayaka, who turned him down, not interested in such a pathetic man. This caused him to become much more hard working and taking studying more seriously. After that, he was able to marry Ayaka. Together they had Ayano and temporarily fostered Kido, Kano and Seto. Kenjirō was interested in the theory of Medusae and researched it with Ayaka, only to be caught in a landslide with her and die. He came in contact with the Heat Haze and was possessed by the snake of 'Clearing Eyes'. He became much more engrossed in research after Ayaka's death, eventually experimenting on and killing his two students (Takane and Haruka), this was done while possessed by the snake of 'Clearing Eyes'. His fate is that he dies and reunites with Ayaka in the Heat Haze; in Route XX, the snake of 'Clearing Eyes' (while it is possessing Konoha) kills him.

 / 

Hiyori is a stubborn young girl from the countryside who yearns for the city. She is very popular at her school and has her own fan club. She drags Hibiya to the city with her in order to get Momo's autograph and stays at her sister's, Ayaka, house. She falls in love with Konoha who was staying there at the time. She becomes involved in a traffic accident and gets stuck in a time loop trying to save Hibiya, but while Hibiya successfully escapes the Heat Haze, she passes away. Despite her apparent pessimistic personality and constant insults she uses towards Hibiya, she truly cares about him. She seemingly thinks of him as an important person; since she never saw her distant older sister before her sister's death; and, because of her popularity that makes it harder for her to be friends with others. She appears in  together with Hibiya, who mostly tells the song through his point of view, changing to Hiyori's only in the final verse. Konoha tries to reach them both in time, but is unable to, as he is not visible physically at the time.

 / 

Shion is a 1/2 medusa and Marry's mother. When Shion was younger, she lived with her parents Azami and Tsukihiko. She loves Marry very much, and in order to protect her she refrains from letting Marry play outside. One day, Marry bypasses her mother's orders and plays outside anyway, however some boys come to attack her. She sacrifices herself in order to save Marry, and uses her eye power to turn the boys to stone; but the strain on her body was too much and she passes away with Marry.

She gets consumed by the Heat Haze and is given the 'Combining Eyes' ability, however she passes the power on to Marry and sends her to the outside world.

 / 

Azami is a full medusa and Shion's mother. Snakes grow from her hair, each with a unique power. She once thought humans were 'dull creatures that die easily' but fell in love with a human named Tsukihiko and started a family. After realizing how short human lives were compared to her immortality, she goes away to use the power of the snakes to create a Never Ending World (The Heat Haze) where she could live with her family forever. It is currently unclear if she waited for her family to arrive in the Heat Haze, before realising that her husband would have died by then, or that when she returned, the villagers attacking her house made her revert to her original ideology, causing her to return to the Never-Ending World alone.
Many years later, her daughter and granddaughter, Shion and Marry were killed on August 15. Knowing this, she was unable to bear her grief and ordered the Heat Haze to "bring in every person who died on August 15", giving the ability of 'Combining Eyes' to Shion to allow her to return to life (who gave it to Marry). This causes her to lose control of the Heat Haze, thus drawing in every person who had died on August 15, the day Marry died, it is presumed that she died due to her power completely taken over by him and eventually suffocating to her death. Her body is later used by the Snake of The Clearing Eyes so that he might able to use her power to find a perfect vessel for him which is Konoha, In the end, she finally able to peacefully die with Shion by her side, finally freed from the torture she has been suffering for very many years.

 / 

Ayaka is Ayano's mother, Kenjirō's wife and Hiyori's sister. She became interested in the myth about Medusae and fell in love with Kenjirō at university. She gave birth to Ayano and temporarily fostered Kido, Kano and Seto from the orphanage after hearing about their strange abilities. She died in a landslide with Kenjirō while researching, passing on her trademark red clips to Ayano.

A soldier who fell in love with Azami. Tsukihiko is a white haired, light-eyed man, and has long been considered a "monster" by the other villagers, due to his appearance. He tells Azami that he is also a "monster", and that they should spend their life together. Together, they had Shion and live peacefully until villagers attacked their home, mistakenly thinking he had been held captive. He is referred to by Azami in  while also being seen with Azami and the younger Shion together in the music video for the song "Days".

Tsubomi's older sister who died when their family home was burned down. She was directly killed by Kido's biological father, who also set the fire that killed them.

In "Mekakucity Actors", she would later encounter the young Tsubomi while Tsubomi is in the Daze, surrounded by "fire", Rin "speaking" to Tsubomi.

While Rin remains trapped in the Daze during most routes, she would also later appear briefly in the novels, as well as being referred to by Kido.

 / 

A snake who, seemingly previously as a "Wide Eyed Snake", suggested to Azami to create the Heat Haze.

In many timelines, it took control of Kenjirō's body and survived under his wish of reuniting with his wife, going to extremes by doing so. Its true goal, however, is living forever. Also in many timelines, it transfers itself to Konoha's body and possesses it, causing Konoha's appearance to change into a "darker" look as well (wearing a full black version of Konoha's clothing, and with black hair).

In many timelines, it then kills all the members of the Mekakushi Dan besides Marry, and has her reset the timeline. This happens by means of her Combining Eyes ability, used through her by the snake of 'Clearing Eyes', who "awakens" her.(often in "Queen" form), and, by "collecting" the snakes that "have lost their owners", she reverses time in order to save everyone. Marry seemingly reverses time at the end of every official "route" and "timeline" seen thus far.

Media

CD / DVDs
The series began as a series of albums that were released alongside the novels. The soundtracks were produced by Jin and released by IA Project. The first album is titled  and was released on May 30, 2012. It was followed by a single, on August 15, 2012. A second album titled  was released on May 29, 2013. A third album titled  was announced on August 15, 2017 and was released November 7, 2018.

Songs
{| class="wikitable plainrowheaders" style="width: 100%; margin: auto;"
|+ Kagerou Project songs
! style="background: #3fa8e2" width="5%;" | No. in series
! style="background: #3fa8e2" width="50%;" | Title
|-

{{Episode list
| EpisodeNumber       = "Final"
| Title               = Outer Science
| TranslitTitle       = Autā Saiensu
| NativeTitle         = アウターサイエンス
| NativeTitleLangCode = ja
| ShortSummary        = Outer Science is known as a "bad end" of the story.

The snake of 'Clearing Eyes' possesses Konoha and kills everyone, leading Marry to use 'Combining Eyes' to turn back time. Because of this, the Snake of 'Clearing Eyes' calls Marry the "Queen" of the tragedy.

The song is told from 'Clearing Eyes point of view.
| LineColor           = 3fa8e2
}}

|}

Light novels
The Kagerou Daze light novels are written by Jin with illustrations from Kagerou Project music video maker Sidu. The first volume was released on May 30, 2012, by Enterbrain on their KCG Bunko imprint, and will conclude in the eighth volume on December 29, 2017. Yen Press has been releasing the novels in English in North America since May 26, 2015.

There is an anthology series called  that is made up of short stories from a Pixiv contest.

There is a novel anthology series named  made from other Pixiv competitions.

Manga
The Kagerou Daze  manga is illustrated by Mahiro Satou. It began serialization in Media Factory's Monthly Comic Gene on June 15, 2012. The first tankōbon volume was released on November 27, 2012; thirteen volumes have been released as of March 27, 2019. Yen Press will release the manga in English in North America, with the first volume released on April 21, 2015.

There is also an ongoing anthology series called  and each volume goes with a certain theme. It is written and illustrated by various people including Kagerou Daze light novel artist and music video creator Sidu, the Kagerou Daze manga artist Mahiro Satou, and Kagerou Project music video creator .

Anime

A Kagerou Project anime titled , directed by Akiyuki Shinbo and produced by Shaft, began airing on April 12, 2014.As Mekakucity Actors airs on Tokyo MX, GTV, GYT and BS11 on Saturdays, 24:00 (Sundays, 00:00 a.m. JST), the premiere technically occurs on Sunday, April 13, 2014. The anime adaptation starring Kana Asumi as Ene, Kana Hanazawa as Mary, and Mamoru Miyano as Konoha. This is the first voice-acting of Asumi since her marriage on January 14, 2014. The teaser website of the anime series was launched on January 17, 2014. The anime has been licensed for streaming by Aniplex of America. The opening theme is "Daze" sung by Maria from Garnidelia and the ending theme is "Days" by Lia. For episode eight, the ending theme is  sung by Kōta Matsuyama from Byee the Round. For episode nine, the opening theme is  sung by Aki Okui. All songs are composed by Jin.

A Kagerou Project short anime film titled  was directed by Sidu and produced by Studio Jumonji. It was produced with MX4D presentation in mind and premiered on November 4, 2016. The opening theme is "Red" by Gouache, a band Jin is a part of.

A Kagerou Project'' anime titled  was announced at the Seek at Mekakucity event on August 15, 2016.

Notes

References

External links
 Official website 
 Anime official website 
 Anime official website
 Jin's official website 
 Jin's official twitter 
 Sidu's official twitter 
 Wannyanpū official twitter 

2012 Japanese novels
2012 manga
Anime and manga based on light novels
Aniplex
Creative works using vocaloids
Fiction with alternate endings
Japanese songs
Josei manga
Kadokawa Dwango franchises
Light novels
Media Factory manga
Shaft (company)
Television shows set in Japan
Time loop anime and manga
Tokyo MX original programming
Yen Press titles